Peter Bernard Wight (25 June 1930 -  31 December 2015) was a Guyanese first-class cricketer who played for Somerset, Canterbury and British Guiana. Wight was a prolific run scorer at the top of the order, scoring 16,965 runs during his thirteen years at Somerset; and at the time of his death only Harold Gimblett had made more runs for the county. After playing, he became an umpire in English first-class cricket, standing in matches from 1966 to 1995.

Early life
His family was a mix of Scottish and Portuguese blood with good cricketing talent. His cousin, Vibart Wight had represented the West Indies twice, acting as vice-captain in the third Test against England in 1928. His elder brother Leslie Wight also went on to play Test cricket for the West Indies, while his other brothers represented British Guiana at cricket, hockey, tennis and soccer.

Wight came to England at the age of 20, arriving on a cargo boat in 1951. The conditions in England came as a shock to him, with rationing and outside toilets still prevalent. He had arrived in the country with the intention of studying engineering, but his employer in Burnley refused to release him, as promised, for his motor mechanic exams. With this, he emigrated to Toronto before returning to Lancashire to work in a factory.

Career

Playing career
In 1953, he was scoring runs for Burnley Cricket Club in the Lancashire League when his brother-in-law suggested he try out for Somerset. He impressed in the nets and was selected to play in a trial game, against the touring Australians. A shaky start saw him dismissed for a first-innings duck but he scored a century in the second-innings and was offered a Somerset contract.

Wight passed 1,000 runs in a season for the first of ten successive years during 1954; his first full season with the county, totalling 1,343 runs in 50 first-class innings. The following year he made his maiden County Championship century, with 106 in the first innings of a nine wicket victory over Worcestershire. The next three seasons proceeded in a similar fashion, with Wight scoring runs with an average fluctuating between the high twenties and low thirties, failing to make the big scores needed to boost it further.

It was during the 1959 season that he truly established himself as one of the leading batsmen in English cricket, despite missing a number of games due to eye problems. He finished the season with 1,874 runs, and with the joint second highest batting average (of those playing more than 2 innings) in the County Championship, behind only M. J. K. Smith. His career best score came also during this season, when he achieved 222* for Somerset against the visiting Kent at the County Ground, Taunton.

Coaching and umpiring career
When he was released by Somerset in 1965 he had scored 16,965 runs for the county. After retiring he opened a cricket school in Bath and spent 30 summers as an umpire. He umpired 567 games in total and when added to his games as a player he holds the record for most first-class appearances in Post-War England.

Honours

First-class
 Passed 1,000 first-class runs in a season: 1954, 1955, 1956, 1957, 1958, 1959, 1960, 1961, 1962, 1963
 Passed 2,000 first-class runs in a season: 1960, 1962
 County Championship leading run-scorer: 1960

Miscellaneous
 Named as one of the Playfair Cricket Annual Eleven Cricketers of the Year in 1961.

Notes

External links

1930 births
2015 deaths
Guyanese cricketers
English cricketers
Somerset cricketers
Canterbury cricketers
Commonwealth XI cricketers
Guyanese cricket umpires
Guyana cricketers
A. E. R. Gilligan's XI cricketers
Guyanese people of Scottish descent
Guyanese people of Portuguese descent
Sportspeople from Georgetown, Guyana